The Prince of Denmark is a British comedy television series which first aired on BBC 1 in 1974. It was made as a sequel to Now Look Here.

Main cast
 Ronnie Corbett as Ronnie
 Rosemary Leach as Laura
 David Warwick as Steve
 Michael Nightingale as Crossword man 
 Tim Barrett as Blackburn
 Declan Mulholland as  Danny 
 Penny Irving as Polly

References

Bibliography
 Stephen Wagg. Because I Tell a Joke or Two: Comedy, Politics and Social Difference. Routledge, 2004.

External links
 

BBC television sitcoms
1974 British television series debuts
1974 British television series endings
1970s British comedy television series
English-language television shows